Hugh Thomas (died 18 December 1976) was an Australian rules football coach who coached St Kilda in the Victorian Football League (VFL).

Thomas served initially as an assistant coach to Jock McHale at Collingwood, in what was a successful era for the club. He became St Kilda's senior coach in 1944 and steered them to ninth position, with six wins and two draws during the year. After they struggled in 1945, Thomas was replaced by Allan Hird. In 1950, he coached VFA club Preston for the year.

His brother Artie was a rover at St Kilda from 1910 to 1913.

References

All The Stats: Hugh Thomas

St Kilda Football Club coaches
Preston Football Club (VFA) coaches
Year of birth missing
1976 deaths
Australian rules footballers from Victoria (Australia)